Marian Orr (born 1970) is an American politician who served as the first female mayor of Cheyenne, Wyoming.

Early life 
Orr graduated from the University of Wyoming with a degree in communications in 1992.

Career 
She was elected mayor of Cheyenne in 2016 with 56% of the vote.

Mark Gordon controversy

Orr received national coverage when she met with the Governor of Wyoming, Mark Gordon over a proposed visit from a Taiwanese delegation. She accused him of swearing at her, saying “Fuck you, mayor”, and using “his physical presence in an aggressive and threatening manner”. Gordon wished to cancel the visit while Orr proposed keeping it. Gordon later apologized to Orr for his language but stated publicly that her claims about his physical behavior were mischaracterized. Orr stated that the reason she felt she had to publicize the Governor's behavior was that "(w)e can't be silent to bad behavior from men treating women that way. It's unacceptable."

Personal life 
Marian was married to journalist Jimmy Orr, who served as White House Internet Director from 2001 to 2004. On December 20, 2019, police responded to a report of a disturbance at the Orr home and arrested Jimmy Orr on suspicion of domestic violence. By December 24, 2019 he was released from custody and charged with misdemeanor domestic battery, later pleading guilty to a lesser charge of unlawful contact.  Mr. Orr was sentenced to two years of unsupervised probation and ordered to pay $300 to the crime victim's compensation fund, in addition to associated fees and court costs. Mr. Orr later filed for divorce.

References 

1970 births
21st-century American politicians
21st-century American women politicians
Living people
Mayors of Cheyenne, Wyoming
Politicians from Casper, Wyoming
University of Wyoming alumni
Women mayors of places in Wyoming
Wyoming Republicans